Sir Thomas Shenton Whitelegge Thomas  (10 October 1879 – 15 January 1962), commonly known as Sir Shenton Thomas, was a British colonial administrator most notable for his role as Governor of the Straits Settlements in Singapore.

He served from 9 November 1934 to 15 February 1942, during which time the Second World War broke out, and again from 12 September 1945 to 31 March 1946, when the Straits Settlements was dissolved and Singapore became a crown colony.

He was a prisoner-of-war (POW) during the Japanese occupation of Singapore, having decided to stay in Singapore during the war.

Early life
Thomas Shenton Whitelegge Thomas was born on 10 October 1879, in Southwark, London to The Rev Thomas William Thomas and his wife Charlotte Susanna ( Whitelegge) Thomas. 

He was educated at St. John's School, Leatherhead and Queens' College, Cambridge.

Career
Thomas taught at Aysgarth School in Yorkshire prior to entering the Colonial Service.

Africa
In 1909, Thomas was appointed as Assistant District Commissioner, East Africa Protectorate (Nairobi, Kenya). In 1919, he was appointed Assistant Chief Secretary, Uganda and in 1920 as Chairman of the Uganda Development Commission.

In 1921, he was appointed Principal Assistant Secretary, Nigeria and in 1923, was appointed Deputy Chief Secretary, Nigeria. In 1927, he was appointed Colonial Secretary, Gold Coast Colony (Ghana) before he was appointed Governor of Nyasaland in 1929. In 1932 he was appointed Governor and Commander-in-Chief of the Gold Coast Colony (Ghana).

Malaya
In 1934, he was appointed Governor and Commander-in-Chief of the Straits Settlements and High Commissioner of the Federated Malay States.

Singapore

Thomas was a prisoner-of-war (POW) during the Japanese occupation of Singapore (15 February 1942 – 15 August 1945) having decided to stay in Singapore during the war. He was imprisoned in Cell 24 of Changi Prison along with missionary Ernest Tipson.

After the war, Thomas remained as the 11th British High Commissioner in Malaya (9 November 1934 – 1 April 1946), until the Malayan Union was established and succeeded the British administration in the Straits Settlements (except for Singapore, which was created as a distinct crown colony), Federated Malay States and Unfederated Malay States, where the post of Governor-General of the Malayan Union was created. Shenton Way, a road in Singapore, was named after him.

Personal life
He married Lucy Marguerite (Daisy) Montgomery (1884-1978) daughter of James Montgomery on 11 April 1912 at St Jude's Church, Kensington, London.

Thomas died on 15 January 1962, at his home in London. He was 82.

Legacy
Thomas is widely associated in his role as governor with the loss of Singapore and his civilian administration's apparent failures to properly assess the growing Japanese threat and make appropriate defences. Singapore's capture by the Japanese, in conjunction with other events at the time such as the sinking of Prince of Wales and Repulse, severely undermined British prestige and contributed to the eventual end of colonialism in the region. 

During the 1950s, Shenton Way, a road in Singapore's central business district, was named after him as recognition of his decision to remain and become a prisoner of war (POW) at Changi Prison when the Japanese occupied Singapore.

Gallery

Honours
 Officer of the Order of the British Empire (1919)
 Companion of the Order of St Michael and St George (CMG) (1929)
 Knight Commander of the Order of St Michael and St George (KCMG) - Sir (1930)
 King George V Silver Jubilee Medal (1935)
 Knight Grand Cross of the Order of St Michael and St George (GCMG) - Sir (1937)
 King George VI Coronation Medal (1937)
 Knight of Grace of the Order of Saint John (1938)

See also
Elizabeth Choy – Singaporean educator and resistance worker during World War II

Notes

References

External links
 Singapore Infopedia entry

Administrators in British Malaya
Administrators in British Singapore
1879 births
1962 deaths
Alumni of Queens' College, Cambridge
Knights Grand Cross of the Order of St Michael and St George
British World War II prisoners of war
World War II political leaders
People from Southwark
People educated at St John's School, Leatherhead
Governors of the Straits Settlements